Momberg is a surname, and can refer to:

Jacques Momberg (born 1991), South African rugby union player
Dutch Momberg (1934–1995), professional wrestler better known as Killer Karl Krupp